Claude de Gronckel (born 21 May 1943) is a former tennis player from Belgium who was active in the 1950s and 1960s.

Tennis career
De Gronckel participated in the 1959 and 1961 Wimbledon boys' singles events, losing in the second round and semifinals, respectively.

De Gronckel was a regular member of the Belgium Davis Cup team throughout the 1960s, making his debut in 1960 against Brazil during the Europe Zone second round tie. During his Davis Cup career, he played 6 singles and 4 doubles matches without scoring any victories.

See also
List of Belgium Davis Cup team representatives

References

External links
  
 

1943 births
Living people
Belgian male tennis players